Jung Kyung-ho (born March 17, 1972) is a South Korean actor. He starred in film such as R2B: Return to Base (2012) and The Piper (2015).

Filmography

Film

Television series

Musical

Variety show

References

External links

1972 births
Living people
South Korean male television actors
South Korean male film actors
South Korean male stage actors
Seoul Institute of the Arts alumni